The Columbia pebblesnail, scientific name Fluminicola columbiana, is a species of very small freshwater snail that have an operculum, aquatic gastropod mollusk in the family Lithoglyphidae. This species is endemic to the United States.

References

Endemic fauna of the United States
Molluscs of the United States
Lithoglyphidae
Gastropods described in 1899
Freshwater snails
Taxonomy articles created by Polbot